The Namibian ambassador in Brasilia is the official representative of the Government in Windhoek to the Government of Brazil

List of representatives

See also
 Brazil–Namibia relations

References 

Brazil
Namibia